"Loved Me Back to Life" is a song by Canadian singer Celine Dion. It was released on 3 September 2013 by Columbia Records as the first single from her eleventh English-language studio album of the same name (2013). The song was co-written by Sia, Hasham "Sham" Hussain and Denarius "Motesart" Motes, and produced by Sham and Motesart. The official live music video was uploaded on Vevo on 18 September 2013. "Loved Me Back to Life" received critical acclaim and became a top forty hit in various countries, including number fourteen in the United Kingdom, number seventeen in South Korea, number twenty-five in Switzerland and Belgium, number twenty-six in Canada, number twenty-nine in Ireland, number thirty-two in France and number thirty-eight in Germany and Austria.

Composition and release
"Loved Me Back to Life" is a power ballad sung in a minor key, backed by a chorus that features a dubstep beat drop. It was co-written by Sia who, among many achievements, provided vocals for David Guetta's "Titanium" and wrote the lyrics and melody for Rihanna's "Diamonds". The production duties were handled by  Hasham "Sham" Hussain and Denarius "Motesart" Motes, who are also responsible for "Is Anybody Out There?" by K'naan and Nelly Furtado. "Loved Me Back to Life" premiered on the radio on 3 September 2013 and was released as a digital download on the same day. The official audio for the single was then released onto Dion's Vevo channel. The song was sent to adult contemporary radio stations in the United States on 9 September 2013 and "Loved Me Back to Life" (BBC Radio 2 Mix) premiered on BBC Radio 2 in the United Kingdom on 28 September 2013. The making of "Loved Me Back to Life" was released on Vevo on 24 September 2013. The dance remixes were done by David Morales, Dave Audé and Jump Smokers, and were officially released in October 2013.

Critical reception
"Loved Me Back to Life" received critical acclaim from music critics. Gary Graff of Billboard write that Dion has acknowledged modern pop trends with the lead single and title track from her first English-language album in six years. The "stuttering" vocal hook and dubstep beats are certainly of the moment, keeping pace with the Rihannas of the world, while Dion's own performance—full and soaring, if a bit darker in tone than usual—is characteristically "Âcommanding". Popjournalism praised the song and concluded: "'Life' nicely sets up Dion's 5 Nov album release as a unit-selling single that hits the perfect mainstream sweet spot without alienating even her most milquetoast fan". MTV's Brad Stern also praised and named it as one of five must-hear pop songs of the week: "For her first English studio album in six years, Celine's leading with "Loved Me Back to Life," a major power ballad penned by pop's most in-demand songwriter, Sia. It's a serious chills-inducing belter, packed full of emotion and crisp production. Welcome back, Celine, we missed you!"  The Huffington Post was also positive, but little less by: "a supremely modern track which sees the 45-year-old legend dipping into dubstep and even employing a bit of a hip-hop style beat. The song is nice, but it almost sounds like her soaring chorus is going to be followed up by some fiery Eminem verses over the skittering bass and drums". Idolator editor Sam Lansky wrote a rave review: "That stuttering vocal loop! The bombastic production! The funky instrumentation! The huge, surging chorus! The dubby beat drop on the refrain! The fact that it was written by Sia! The fact that it's new Celine Dion in the first place! It's all just marvellous. Unsurprisingly, the song has shades of Rihanna's "Diamonds," but it feels markedly fresh and modern in its own right; as many divas have shown, staying relevant gets thornier when you’re entering, y’know, your fourth decade as an international superstar, but this is a solid effort from the Canadian chanteuse that should introduce her to some new fans as well as satisfying longtime supporters".

OK! compared: "Her new song, in my opinion, is like Cher meets J.Lo and is a departure from "My Heart Will Go On" but I'm into it. You?". Feedback Musiq praised a song: "The studio cut sounds as powerful as she did live and is easily one of the best lyrical efforts by Sia. If six years has been too long for you, you’re about to fall in love with Celine all over again as she gives you life with this new one". DaysTune was surprised: "I'm not sure expectations were that high, for something "up to date" from the Pop Diva. Proving she's still got it, Dion surprises by delivering a more electronic feeling pop song, with edgy vocals and of course displays of her vocal prowess". Jon Ali was another impressed reviewer: "lead single "Loved Me Back to Life" hears Celine alternate between her trademark soaring vocals and a smoky, lower register, all against the backdrop of a dark and moody production. It's what we have come to expect from her but with a modern twist that perfectly mixes Celine's classic sound with today's sound – I love it. Welcome back, Celine!". KEZK-FM wrote that "On her new song "Loved Me Back to Life," Dion seems to be channelling Rihanna, Miley and Katy with a heavily produced pop song written by Sia (...) that has her stuttering "back to life" over a bevvy of synths. (...) Say goodbye to the "My Heart Will Go On" Celine Dion you used to know and love, and say hello to a more EDM-influenced Celine". SheKnows Entertainment was also favourable: "Dion has been revived with her latest single, "Loved Me Back to Life" and though the lyrics are touching, it's her trademark, full-throttle delivery that has me gushing".

Commercial performance
In the United States, "Loved Me Back to Life" debuted at number twenty-six on the Billboard'''s Adult Contemporary becoming Dion's fortieth entry on this chart. It made her the fifth woman with most entries on the AC chart, after Barbra Streisand, Dionne Warwick, Linda Ronstadt and Anne Murray. "Loved Me Back to Life" peaked on the AC chart in the third week, reaching number twenty-four. The song has sold 23,000 downloads in the first week enabling its debut on Pop Digital Songs at number nineteen and on Hot Digital Songs at number sixty-three. As of 3 November 2013, it had sold 49,000 digital copies in the United States. "Loved Me Back to Life" also debuted on the Hot Dance Club Songs in mid-November 2013 and peaked there at number three in mid-January 2014. In Canada, the song landed the Hot Shot Debut on the Canadian Hot 100, coming in at number twenty-six. It became Dion's best debut to date on the chart and her second best peak on the list, only behind 2007's "Taking Chances". The single also debuted at number fifteen on the Canadian Hot Digital Songs chart. In the United Kingdom, "Loved Me Back to Life" reached number fourteen becoming Dion's highest charting single since "A New Day Has Come" got to number seven in 2002. In other countries, the song reached number twenty-five in Switzerland and Belgium, number twenty-nine in Ireland, number thirty-two in France and number thirty-eight in Germany and Austria.

Music video
On 18 September 2013, the live performance of "Loved Me Back to Life" was uploaded onto Dion's official Vevo channel. It was taken from her sold-out, Celine... une seule fois concert in Quebec City on 27 July 2013. The lyric video was also released on 15 October 2013.

Live performances
In Canada, Dion surprised the audience of her Celine... une seule fois concert in Quebec City on 27 July 2013 by singing "Loved Me Back to Life" live for the very first time. The performance was included on Céline une seule fois / Live 2013 CD/DVD (2014). She also performed it on Le Banquier on 3 November 2013. In the United States, Dion performed the song on Jimmy Kimmel Live! on 6 September 2013, The Ellen DeGeneres Show on 11 September 2013, Late Night with Jimmy Fallon on 28 October 2013 and The View on 30 October  2013. Additionally, she gave an intimate club performance at the Edison Ballroom in New York City on 29 October 2013 which was broadcast on 1 November 2013 on QVC. It was uploaded onto Dion's official Vevo channel on 8 November 2013.

Later, she visited Europe. Dion performed "Loved Me Back to Life" on Wetten, dass..? in Germany on 9 November 2013, The X Factor in the United Kingdom on 10 November 2013 and C'est votre vie in France on 16 November 2013. She also performed the song during her Sans attendre Tour which started in Belgium on 21 November 2013. In France, Dion performed "Loved Me Back to Life" on Les chansons d'abord on 1 December 2013, Vivement Dimanche on 8 December 2013, Les disques d'Or on 18 December 2013 and Ce soir on chante on 3 January 2014.

She returned to the United States in mid-December 2013 and sang "Loved Me Back to Life" on 18 December 2013 during the CBS 15th annual A Home for the Holidays television special that celebrates the joy of adoption by sharing stories of adoption from foster care in order to raise awareness for the cause. On 30 December 2013, Dion officially added "Loved Me Back to Life" to the set list of her Las Vegas show, Celine. The performance from this day was recorded and broadcast on 31 December 2013 as part of the ET Canadas New Year's Eve at Niagara Falls. The song was also performed in Dion's 2017 European tour.

Track listing and formatsDigital single and German CD single'''
"Loved Me Back to Life" (Album Version) – 3:50
"Loved Me Back to Life" (Dave Audé Radio Extended) – 4:27

Remixes

 "Loved Me Back to Life" (David Morales La Vie in Stereo Remix) – 6:49
 "Loved Me Back to Life" (David Morales La Vie in Stereo DJ Remix) – 6:49
 "Loved Me Back to Life" (David Morales La Vie in Stereo Radio Edit) – 4:00
 "Loved Me Back to Life" (Dave Audé Club Mix) – 7:00
 "Loved Me Back to Life" (Dave Audé Radio Mix) – 4:16
 "Loved Me Back to Life" (Dave Audé Radio Extended) – 4:27
 "Loved Me Back to Life" (Dave Audé Mixshow) – 5:59
 "Loved Me Back to Life" (Dave Audé Dub) – 6:56
 "Loved Me Back to Life" (Dave Audé Instrumental) – 6:59
 "Loved Me Back to Life" (Jump Smokers Club Mix) – 4:39
 "Loved Me Back to Life" (Jump Smokers Extended Mix) – 5:00
 "Loved Me Back to Life" (Jump Smokers Dub) – 4:36
 "Loved Me Back to Life" (Jump Smokers Instrumental) – 4:34

Charts

Certifications and sales

Credits and personnel
Recording
Vocals recorded at Studio at the Palms, Las Vegas, Nevada
Mixed at Larrabee Studios, North Hollywood, California

Personnel

Songwriting – Hasham "Sham" Hussain, Denarius "Motesart" Motes, Sia Furler
Production – Sham, Motesart
Vocals production – Sham
Recording engineer – Sham
Vocals recording – François Lalonde
Vocals recording assistant – Rob Katz
Mixing – Manny Marroquin
Mixing assistants – Chris Galland, Delbert Bowers
Instruments and programming – Motesart
Background Vocals – Sia Furler (uncredited)

Release history

References

External links

2013 singles
2013 songs
2010s ballads
Celine Dion songs
Columbia Records singles
Pop ballads
Songs written by Sia (musician)